Gintaras Staučė (born 24 December 1969) is a Lithuanian football coach and a former player. He is the goalkeeping coach for the Hungarian club Ferencváros.

Club career 
Among the other teams he played for were Spartak Moscow, Galatasaray in Turkey, and the Bundesliga's MSV Duisburg.

International career 
An outstanding goalkeeper, he won 61 caps for the Lithuanian national football team, and is the former record holder for his country.

On 30 August 2004, Staučė announced his international retirement ahead of the start of the 2006 FIFA World Cup qualifying campaign, and was replaced in the Lithuanian team by Žydrūnas Karčemarskas.

Coaching career
Upon retirement, he became part of Stanislav Cherchesov's coaching team as a goalkeeping coach, following Cherchesov with his appointments. At the 2018 FIFA World Cup, Cherchesov coached Russia, who defeated Spain in the Round of 16 in the penalty shoot-out, which Staučė helped to prepare Russia's goalkeeper Igor Akinfeev for, analyzing the penalty taking tendencies of Spain players.

Career statistics

Honours

Club
 Russian Premier League champion: 1992, 1993, 1994 (3)
 Soviet Cup winner: 1992
 Russian Cup winner: 1994
 Turkish Cup runner-up: 1994–95
 German Cup runner-up: 1997–98

Country (USSR)
UEFA Euro Under-16 third place: 1986
UEFA Euro Under-18 winner: 1988

Individual
Lithuanian Player of the Year: 1995, 1996

References

External links
 
 
 
 Career statistics

1969 births
Sportspeople from Alytus
Living people
Soviet footballers
Lithuanian footballers
Lithuania international footballers
Association football goalkeepers
FC Spartak Moscow players
Galatasaray S.K. footballers
Karşıyaka S.K. footballers
Sarıyer S.K. footballers
MSV Duisburg players
A.P.O. Akratitos Ano Liosia players
Fostiras F.C. players
Kallithea F.C. players
FK Daugava (2003) players
Russian Premier League players
Süper Lig players
Bundesliga players
2. Bundesliga players
Super League Greece players
Football League (Greece) players
Latvian Higher League players
Lithuanian expatriate footballers
Expatriate footballers in Russia
Lithuanian expatriate sportspeople in Russia
Expatriate footballers in Turkey
Lithuanian expatriate sportspeople in Turkey
Expatriate footballers in Germany
Lithuanian expatriate sportspeople in Germany
Expatriate footballers in Greece
Lithuanian expatriate sportspeople in Greece
Expatriate footballers in Latvia
Lithuanian expatriate sportspeople in Latvia
Association football goalkeeping coaches
Lithuanian expatriate sportspeople in Poland
Lithuanian expatriate sportspeople in Hungary